Hazlerigg may refer to:

Places
Hazlerigg, a village in Tyne & Wear
Hazelrigg, Cumbria, England
Hazelrigg, Lancashire, England
Hazelrigg House, Northampton. A grade II listed building
Hazelrigg, Indiana, United States

People
Clara H. Hazelrigg (1859–1937), American author, educator, social reformer
Lawrence E. Hazelrigg, American academic - usually quoted by surname only
Baron Hazlerigg,  A title in the Peerage of the United Kingdom
Arthur Haselrig, a 17th century English parliamentarian
Tulle Hazelrigg, American biologist